The name Fernand has been used for two tropical cyclones in the Atlantic Ocean. Both formed in the southwestern Gulf of Mexico.
 Tropical Storm Fernand (2013), short-lived tropical storm that struck Veracruz, Mexico.
 Tropical Storm Fernand (2019), another short-lived tropical storm that made landfall over northeastern Mexico.

See also
 Cyclone Ferdinand, a similar name which was used during the 2019–20 Australian cyclone season.

Atlantic hurricane set index articles